The Prince of Wales Orthopaedic Hospital was a specialist orthopaedic hospital in Rhydlafar, Cardiff, Wales.

History
The hospital was established in James Howell House, formerly a domestic house and lodging house in The Walk, Cardiff as the Wales and Monmouthshire Hospital for Limbless Sailors and Soldiers in 1914. It was renamed the Prince of Wales Orthopaedic Hospital when it was officially opened by the Prince of Wales in 1918.  To mark the opening, a cromlech was erected in the front garden by Sir John Lynn-Thomas, a surgeon at the hospital.

It moved to the partially derelict site of a former American  military hospital at Rhydlafar in 1953. In time, the hospital became a centre of excellence in the treatment of orthopaedic patients, and the National Blood Transfusion Service (Wales) relocated to the site in 1956. In later years, students were sent to the hospital for their orthopaedic training. However, the hospital was threatened with closure on a number of occasions and, after services had been transferred to other hospitals in the area, it finally closed in 1998.

The site previously occupied by the hospital is now a housing development on a landscaped site with a children's playground.

References

Further reading

External links
Prince of Wales Orthopaedic Hospital, Rhydlafar Coflein

Defunct hospitals in Wales
Hospital buildings completed in 1953
Hospitals established in 1914
Hospitals in Cardiff
1914 establishments in Wales